Dippach-Reckange railway station is a railway station serving the town of Bettange-sur-Mess, in south-western Luxembourg.  It is named after the nearby towns of Dippach and Reckange-sur-Mess, which lie to the north-west and south-east of Bettange respectively.  It is operated by Chemins de Fer Luxembourgeois, the state-owned railway company.

The station is situated on Line 70, which connects the south-west of the country to Luxembourg City.

External links
 Official CFL page on Dippach-Reckange station
 Rail.lu page on Dippach-Reckange station

Dippach
Railway stations in Luxembourg
Railway stations on CFL Line 70